The Brecon Mountain Railway (Welsh: Rheilffordd Mynydd Brycheiniog) is a  narrow gauge tourist railway on the south side of the Brecon Beacons. It climbs northwards from Pant along the full length of the Pontsticill Reservoir (also called 'Taf Fechan' reservoir by Welsh Water) and continues past the adjoining Pentwyn Reservoir to Torpantau railway station.

Route description 

This takes the BMR just short of the southern entrance to the 667 yd (610 m) long Torpantau tunnel, the highest railway tunnel in Great Britain, which carried the original line through the hills along the side of Glyn Collwn to Brecon or to Moat Lane or Hereford via junctions at Talyllyn and Three Cocks.

One of the benefits of the line, and a condition of the planning permission, is that tourists can access and experience part of the Brecon Beacons National Park without driving their cars through it. Car parking for railway passengers is only available at Pant Station, outside the Brecon Beacons National Park.

The Brecon Mountain Railway is a member of the Great Little Trains of Wales.

History
The Brecon Mountain Railway was founded in the mid-1970s, by Tony Hills (1937–2015). Hills was a long time railway enthusiast who by 1970, had established a base at Gilfach Ddu on the Llanberis Lake Railway where he stored the locomotives he purchased. In 1977, he purchased five miles of trackbed of the abandoned Brecon & Merthyr Railway at Pant and moved his collection there. Construction of the BMR started in 1978, with the grant of a Light Railway Order in 1980. Track was laid between Pant and Pontsticill in 1979–80. At Pontsticill the station house was renovated, the old waiting room was converted into a small workshop and a storage shed was built. Seven bridges were repaired or replaced. The railway opened to passengers in June 1980 using the engine Sybil and one carriage.

Between 1982 and 1996, a large station and workshop were built at Pant. These provide passenger facilities including toilets, cafe, shop and booking office as well as the extensive workshop used to build and maintain the railway locomotives, carriages and wagons.

A  extension from Pontsticill to Dol-y-Gaer opened in 1995. The railway was further extended to Torpantau, just short of the southern entrance of the Torpantau Tunnel, with passenger services commencing 1 April 2014.

By 2016, the original waiting room building at Pontsticill, which had served as a workshop for a period, was converted into a steam museum housing various stationary steam engines and three of the smaller locomotives. All of the stationary units were connected up to a steam distribution header and boiler, which in 2017 was still awaiting commissioning.

Stations 
Pant – southern terminus of the BMR.
Pontsticill  –  at the southern end of the Pontsticill reservoir.
Dolygaer  –  station closed, but passing loop in use.
Torpantau –  current northern terminus of the BMR.

Locomotives

Full list of locomotives at the site:

See also

British narrow gauge railways
List of British heritage and private railways
List of closed railway lines in Great Britain

References

External links
 Official website
 BMR listing
 Picture of New Torpantau station (before opening)

Heritage railways in Merthyr Tydfil
Heritage railways in Powys
History of Merthyr Tydfil
History of Powys
Narrow gauge railways in Merthyr Tydfil
Narrow gauge railways in Powys
Brecon Beacons
1 ft 11¾ in gauge railways in Wales
Mountain railways